SS Chesterfield was a cargo vessel built for the Great Central Railway in 1913.

History

The ship was built by Swan Hunter and launched in 1913. She was the first of an order of two ships from Swan Hunter, the other being . She was deployed on the Grimsby to Rotterdam service.

She was requisitioned by the British Admiralty in October 1914 for use as a fleet messenger and renamed HMS Chesterfield.

References

1913 ships
Steamships of the United Kingdom
Ships built on the River Tyne
Ships of the Great Central Railway
Maritime incidents in 1918
Ships sunk by German submarines in World War I
World War I shipwrecks in the Mediterranean Sea